This is a list of museums located in Philippines provinces in Luzon, Visayas, and Mindanao regions.

Luzon

Visayas

Mindanao

See also

List of museums
Tourism in the Philippines
Arts of the Philippines
Culture of the Philippines

References

Philippines
 
Museums
Museums
Museums
Philippines